The 2015–16 Danish 1st Division season is the 20th season of the Danish 1st Division league championship, governed by the Danish Football Association.

The division-champion, the runners-up and the third placed team are promoted to the 2016–17 Danish Superliga because the Danish Superliga will be expanded to 14 teams from the beginning of the 2016–17 season. The team in the 12th place is relegated to the 2016–17 Danish 2nd Divisions.

Participants
FC Vestsjælland and Silkeborg IF finished the 2014–15 season of the Superliga in 11th and 12th place, respectively, and were relegated to the 1st Division. They replaced Viborg FF and AGF, who were promoted to the 2015–16 Danish Superliga.

FC Helsingør and Næstved BK won promotion from the 2014–15 Danish 2nd Divisions. They replaced Akademisk Boldklub and Brønshøj Boldklub.

Stadia and locations

Personnel and sponsoring 
Note: Flags indicate national team as has been defined under FIFA eligibility rules. Players and Managers may hold more than one non-FIFA nationality.

Managerial changes

League table

Top scorers

See also
2015–16 in Danish football

References

External links
  Danish FA

2015–16 in Danish football
Danish 1st Division
Danish 1st Division seasons